Founded in 1961, Air Partner is a global aviation services group providing aircraft charter services and aviation safety & security to industry, commerce, governments and private individuals across the world.

Air Partner Charter offers Group Charter, Private Jets, Freight and other Specialist Services such as Tour Operations, Air Evacuation, Aircraft Sales & Leasing and Flight Operations. 

Charter work represents Air Partner's largest income stream at 87% of the group’s profits.  

Air Partner Safety & Security services span consulting, research, training and managed services.

With its headquarters located alongside Gatwick airport in the United Kingdom, the Group employs 400 workers.

In April 2022, Air Partner group was acquired by Wheels Up and delisted from the London Stock Exchange.

History
Air Partner was founded in 1961 by Tony Mack Senior trading as Airways Training. It began as a school for military pilots converting to civilian flying using flight simulators and a fleet of Beagles.  

Following the years as a flying school, Air Partner formed an air taxi operation with a fleet of Chieftain, Piper Aztec, 125 and C550 aircraft. At this time the company name was changed to Air London to reflect the change in business focus.  

In 1983 the company surrendered its Air Operator’s Licence to concentrate on aircraft broking. In 1999 Air London became Air Partner.

Air Partner Plc was acquired by Wheels Up in April 2022.

Chronology
1961: Tony Mack Senior founded Airways Training, converting military pilots to civilian flying using flight simulators and a fleet of Beagles.  

1960’s/80’s: The years that followed saw expansion into air taxi operations, and Airways Training was renamed Air London.

1983: Air London launches a new concept in aircraft broking.

1989: Air Partner floated on the Unlisted Securities Market, the forerunner to the Alternative Investment Market (AIM).

1994: Overseas expansion begins with the opening of Air Partner France in Paris.  

1995: The company achieves full listing on the London Stock Exchange LSE: AIP.

1997: Air Partner opens its first US-based office based in Fort Lauderdale, Florida.

Air Partner opens its second mainland European office in Cologne, Germany.

1998: Specialist freight division launches.

1999: The company name is changed from Air London to Air Partner.

Air Partner Travel Consultants is launched. The IATA and ATOL bonded agency organises scheduled flights, limousine hire and accommodation.

2000: Air Partner continues to expand with new offices opening in Austria, and a second US office opens in New York.

2001: 24/7 office-based operations department opens at London Gatwick HQ.

2003: Air Partner delivers at least 4,000 tonnes of military supplies during the first Gulf War. In an interview with Chairman Tony Mack explained "The Gulf War was a windfall for us. We’d hate to say ‘yippee, we’re going to war’, but I guess the net effect would be positive."

2005: Air Partner opens an office in Italy.

2006: The JetCard membership scheme is unveiled. JetCard offers a wealth of benefits for more regular flyers that delivers value for businesses and individuals.

2007: Air Partner re-brands and launches a new corporate identity, creating two new internal trading boards - Private Jets and Commercial Jets.

2008: Carbon neutral offset options are launched across all flights.

2010: Mark Briffa is appointed CEO.Ministry of Defence military contracts represented over 60% of Air Partner's pre-tax profits.

Air Partner opens an office in Istanbul, Turkey.  

UK headquarter moves to a larger premises alongside London Gatwick Airport, opposite The Beehive - Gatwick’s original terminal building with its grass runways, which opened in 1936. The company first began trading here in 1961 and has remained within 1 km ever since.

Air Partner awarded a four-year contract with the Department for International Development (DfID) to become its “sole provider of passenger and freight air charter services”, and had been hired to be a charter broker to the Foreign and Commonwealth Office Crisis Centre.

2015: Air Partner acquires Cabot Aviation and Baines Simmons.

2016: Air Partner acquires Clockwork Research.

Air Partner acquires SafeSkys.

2018: Air Partner opens a new office in LA.

2019: Air Partner opens new offices in Houston, Singapore and Dubai.

Air Partner acquires Redline.

2020: Air Partner provides vital support throughout the global COVID-19 pandemic, including transporting medical supplies and PPE as well as evacuating over 300 British and EU nationals from Wuhan in the wake of the pandemic.

2021 Acquisition of Kenyon International Emergency Services Inc. 

Between August 2021 and February 2022, the Austrian government awarded Air Partner six Frontex-funded deportation contracts, worth an estimated average of €33,796.

2022 Air Partner Plc acquired by Wheels Up and delisted from London Stock Exchange. 

In August 2022, Air Partner was awarded a €15 million framework contract to arrange charter deportations for the European Coast Guard and Border Agency, Frontex.

References

Defunct airlines of the United Kingdom
2022 mergers and acquisitions